The 2001–02 season was the 81st season in the existence of C.D. Santa Clara and the club's first consecutive season in the top-flight of Portuguese football. In addition to the domestic league, Santa Clara participated in this season's edition of the Taça de Portugal.

Season summary
Santa Clara comfortably escaped relegation and finished in 14th, which was until 2019 their best-ever league finish. They also qualified for the UEFA Intertoto Cup.

First-team squad
Squad at end of season

Left club during season

Competitions

Overview

Primeira Liga

League table

Results summary

Results by round

Notes and references

Notes

References

C.D. Santa Clara seasons
Santa Clara